Yusif Abubakar (died 20 November 2018) was a Ghanaian football coach who managed Medeama, Berekum Chelsea, Aduana Stars, Hearts of Oak and Ghana under-23s. He also managed Techiman City, leaving in June 2016 after five months in the role.

References

1950s births
2018 deaths
Ghanaian football managers
Medeama S.C. managers
Berekum Chelsea F.C. managers
Aduana Stars F.C. managers
Accra Hearts of Oak S.C. managers
Techiman City FC managers
Ghana Premier League managers